Baltoro Kangri (also known as the Golden Throne) is a mountain of the Karakoram mountain range in Gilgit-Baltistan, Pakistan. It lies to the south of the Gasherbrums and east of Chogolisa Peak (7,665 m). The huge Baltoro Glacier (which is one of the largest glaciers outside polar regions) rises from the foot of Baltoro Kangri. In the north of Baltoro Kangri is the Abruzzi Glacier.

In 1963, a Japanese expedition made the first ascent of Baltoro Kangri. The expedition consisted of nine members from the Tokyo University Ski Alpine Club, which was led by Seihei Kato.

See also
 List of mountains in Pakistan
 Baltoro Muztagh

References

Mountains of Gilgit-Baltistan
Seven-thousanders of the Karakoram